Marceli Kosman (born 8 May 1940 in Izbica Kujawska) is a Polish historian. Professor of the Adam Mickiewicz University in Poznań.

He finished secondary school in 1957. Then he studied at the university in Poznań. He gained MA in history in 1962 and PhD in 1966. The title of Kosman's doctoral thesis was Dokumenty i kancelaria wielkiego księcia Witolda. His supervisor was Henryk Łowmiański.

From 1961 to 1968 he was teacher in the secondary school (liceum) in Izbica Kujawska. In 1971 he passed his habilitation.

Selected works
 Na tropach bohaterów "Trylogii" (1966)
 Wielki książę Witold (1967)
 Władysław Jagiełło (1968)
 Królowa Bona (1971)
 Zmierzch Perunka, czyli ostatni poganie nad Bałtykiem (1981)
 Orzeł i Pogoń. Z dziejów polsko-litewskich XIV-XX w. (1992)
 Od chrztu do chrystianizacji. Polska - Ruś - Litwa (1992)
 Na tropach bohaterów "Krzyżaków" (1995)
 Na tropach bohaterów "Quo vadis" (1998)
 Wojciech Jaruzelski wobec wyzwań swoich czasów. O kulturze politycznej w Polsce przełomu tysiącleci (2003)
 Dějiny Polska (2011)

Footnotes

References
 

1940 births
Academic staff of Adam Mickiewicz University in Poznań
20th-century Polish historians
Polish male non-fiction writers
Living people
21st-century Polish historians